Dream Tower is a completed residential building in Dubai Marina district of Dubai, United Arab Emirates.

See also
 List of buildings in Dubai

References

External links
 www.carltonrealestate.ae

Residential skyscrapers in Dubai